Nagna Sathyam is a 1979 Telugu, drama film. The film was directed by U. Visweswar Rao.

Awards
National Film Awards
National Film Award for Best Feature Film in Telugu - 1979

References 

1979 films
1970s Telugu-language films
Best Telugu Feature Film National Film Award winners